Gent RFC is a Belgian rugby club in Ghent. Former IOC president Jacques Rogge was a founding member of the club.

History
The club was founded in 1969 by Jacques Rogge, his brother Philippe Rogge, Pierre Saverys, Jan Standaert and Guy Callebaut. They were all former ASUB Rugby players who found it increasingly hard to travel from Ghent to Brussels, where the aforementioned club was based at the time.

References

External links
 Gent RFC

Belgian rugby union clubs
Rugby clubs established in 1969
Sport in Ghent